Van Vleck can refer to:

People 
John Monroe Van Vleck, American astronomer, father of Edward Burr van Vleck
Edward Burr Van Vleck, American mathematician, father of John Hasbrouck van Vleck, son of John Monroe van Vleck
John Hasbrouck Van Vleck, Nobel Prize-winning American physicist, son of Edward Burr van Vleck
Tom Van Vleck, American computer software engineer
Trevor Van Vleck, All American Pole Vaulter. Creator of the "STA Block" app currently on the apple app store, All Met Cross Country Runner

Places 
Van Vleck, California
Van Vleck, Texas
Van Vleck Observatory, Connecticut (IAU code 298)
Van Vleck (crater)
Van Vleck House and Barn
Van Vleck House and Gardens
Van Vleck Independent School District
Van Vleck High School
Howard Van Vleck Arboretum